Vypolzovo is the name of several rural localities in Russia.

Altai Krai
As of 2012, one rural locality in Altai Krai bears this name:
Vypolzovo, Altai Krai, a selo in Lugovskoy Selsoviet of Talmensky District;

Arkhangelsk Oblast
As of 2012, two rural localities in Arkhangelsk Oblast bear this name:
Vypolzovo, Kotlassky District, Arkhangelsk Oblast, a village in Koryazhemsky Selsoviet of Kotlassky District
Vypolzovo, Vilegodsky District, Arkhangelsk Oblast, a village in Ilyinsky Selsoviet of Vilegodsky District

Belgorod Oblast
As of 2012, one rural locality in Belgorod Oblast bears this name:
Vypolzovo, Belgorod Oblast, a selo in Starooskolsky District

Bryansk Oblast
As of 2012, one rural locality in Bryansk Oblast bears this name:
Vypolzovo, Bryansk Oblast, a selo in Usokhsky Rural Administrative Okrug of Trubchevsky District;

Ivanovo Oblast
As of 2012, two rural localities in Ivanovo Oblast bear this name:
Vypolzovo, Ilyinsky District, Ivanovo Oblast, a village in Ilyinsky District
Vypolzovo, Rodnikovsky District, Ivanovo Oblast, a village in Rodnikovsky District

Kaluga Oblast
As of 2012, two rural localities in Kaluga Oblast bear this name:
Vypolzovo, Kirovsky District, Kaluga Oblast, a village in Kirovsky District
Vypolzovo, Yukhnovsky District, Kaluga Oblast, a village in Yukhnovsky District

Kirov Oblast
As of 2012, three rural localities in Kirov Oblast bear this name:
Vypolzovo, Podosinovsky District, Kirov Oblast, a village under the administrative jurisdiction of Podosinovets Urban-Type Settlement in Podosinovsky District
Vypolzovo, Sanchursky District, Kirov Oblast, a village in Gorodishchensky Rural Okrug of Sanchursky District
Vypolzovo, Uninsky District, Kirov Oblast, a village in Porezsky Rural Okrug of Uninsky District

Kostroma Oblast
As of 2012, six rural localities in Kostroma Oblast bear this name:
Vypolzovo, Dmitriyevskoye Settlement, Galichsky District, Kostroma Oblast, a village in Dmitriyevskoye Settlement of Galichsky District
Vypolzovo, Orekhovskoye Settlement, Galichsky District, Kostroma Oblast, a village in Orekhovskoye Settlement of Galichsky District
Vypolzovo, Orekhovskoye Settlement, Galichsky District, Kostroma Oblast, a village in Orekhovskoye Settlement of Galichsky District
Vypolzovo, Manturovsky District, Kostroma Oblast, a village in Leontyevskoye Settlement of Manturovsky District
Vypolzovo, Sharyinsky District, Kostroma Oblast, a village in Shangskoye Settlement of Sharyinsky District
Vypolzovo, Vokhomsky District, Kostroma Oblast, a village in Lapshinskoye Settlement of Vokhomsky District

Kursk Oblast
As of 2012, one rural locality in Kursk Oblast bears this name:
Vypolzovo, Kursk Oblast, a selo in Vypolzovsky Selsoviet of Solntsevsky District

Leningrad Oblast
As of 2012, one rural locality in Leningrad Oblast bears this name:
Vypolzovo, Leningrad Oblast, a village in Domozhirovskoye Settlement Municipal Formation of Lodeynopolsky District

Lipetsk Oblast
As of 2012, one rural locality in Lipetsk Oblast bears this name:
Vypolzovo, Lipetsk Oblast, a village in Sotnikovsky Selsoviet of Krasninsky District

Mari El Republic
As of 2012, one rural locality in the Mari El Republic bears this name:
Vypolzovo, Mari El Republic, a village in Azanovsky Rural Okrug of Medvedevsky District

Nizhny Novgorod Oblast
As of 2012, five rural localities in Nizhny Novgorod Oblast bear this name:
Vypolzovo, Bor, Nizhny Novgorod Oblast, a village in Krasnoslobodsky Selsoviet under the administrative jurisdiction of the town of oblast significance of Bor
Vypolzovo, Ardatovsky District, Nizhny Novgorod Oblast, a selo in Lichadeyevsky Selsoviet of Ardatovsky District
Vypolzovo, Bogorodsky District, Nizhny Novgorod Oblast, a village in Shapkinsky Selsoviet of Bogorodsky District
Vypolzovo, Dalnekonstantinovsky District, Nizhny Novgorod Oblast, a village in Malopitsky Selsoviet of Dalnekonstantinovsky District
Vypolzovo, Shatkovsky District, Nizhny Novgorod Oblast, a selo in Sharapovsky Selsoviet of Shatkovsky District

Novgorod Oblast
As of 2012, one rural locality in Novgorod Oblast bears this name:
Vypolzovo, Novgorod Oblast, a village in Polavskoye Settlement of Parfinsky District

Perm Krai
As of 2012, one rural locality in Perm Krai bears this name:
Vypolzovo, Perm Krai, a village in Kungursky District

Pskov Oblast
As of 2012, one rural locality in Pskov Oblast bears this name:
Vypolzovo, Pskov Oblast, a village in Plyussky District

Ryazan Oblast
As of 2012, two rural localities in Ryazan Oblast bear this name:
Vypolzovo, Kadomsky District, Ryazan Oblast, a village in Novoselsky Rural Okrug of Kadomsky District
Vypolzovo, Spassky District, Ryazan Oblast, a selo in Vypolzovsky Rural Okrug of Spassky District

Samara Oblast
As of 2012, one rural locality in Samara Oblast bears this name:
Vypolzovo, Samara Oblast, a selo in Volzhsky District

Smolensk Oblast
As of 2012, one rural locality in Smolensk Oblast bears this name:
Vypolzovo, Smolensk Oblast, a village in Kaydakovskoye Rural Settlement of Vyazemsky District

Tula Oblast
As of 2012, one rural locality in Tula Oblast bears this name:
Vypolzovo, Tula Oblast, a village in Velyenikolskaya Rural Administration of Chernsky District

Tver Oblast
As of 2012, three rural localities in Tver Oblast bear this name:
Vypolzovo, Andreapolsky District, Tver Oblast, a village in Volokskoye Rural Settlement of Andreapolsky District
Vypolzovo, Bologovsky District, Tver Oblast, a settlement in Vypolzovskoye Rural Settlement of Bologovsky District
Vypolzovo, Kalyazinsky District, Tver Oblast, a village in Nerlskoye Rural Settlement of Kalyazinsky District

Ulyanovsk Oblast
As of 2012, one rural locality in Ulyanovsk Oblast bears this name:
Vypolzovo, Ulyanovsk Oblast, a selo in Nikitinsky Rural Okrug of Sursky District

Vladimir Oblast
As of 2012, three rural localities in Vladimir Oblast bear this name:
Vypolzovo, Melenkovsky District, Vladimir Oblast, a village in Melenkovsky District
Vypolzovo, Petushinsky District, Vladimir Oblast, a village in Petushinsky District
Vypolzovo, Yuryev-Polsky District, Vladimir Oblast, a village in Yuryev-Polsky District

Vologda Oblast
As of 2012, five rural localities in Vologda Oblast bear this name:
Vypolzovo, Babayevsky District, Vologda Oblast, a village in Volodinsky Selsoviet of Babayevsky District
Vypolzovo, Kichmengsko-Gorodetsky District, Vologda Oblast, a village in Nizhneyenangsky Selsoviet of Kichmengsko-Gorodetsky District
Vypolzovo, Sokolsky District, Vologda Oblast, a village in Prigorodny Selsoviet of Sokolsky District
Vypolzovo, Ustyuzhensky District, Vologda Oblast, a village in Nikiforovsky Selsoviet of Ustyuzhensky District
Vypolzovo, Velikoustyugsky District, Vologda Oblast, a village in Nizhneyerogodsky Selsoviet of Velikoustyugsky District

Yaroslavl Oblast
As of 2012, six rural localities in Yaroslavl Oblast bear this name:
Vypolzovo, Danilovsky District, Yaroslavl Oblast, a village in Semivragovsky Rural Okrug of Danilovsky District
Vypolzovo, Pereslavsky District, Yaroslavl Oblast, a village in Zagoryevsky Rural Okrug of Pereslavsky District
Vypolzovo, Poshekhonsky District, Yaroslavl Oblast, a village in Leninsky Rural Okrug of Poshekhonsky District
Vypolzovo, Rostovsky District, Yaroslavl Oblast, a village in Sulostsky Rural Okrug of Rostovsky District
Vypolzovo, Tutayevsky District, Yaroslavl Oblast, a village in Pomogalovsky Rural Okrug of Tutayevsky District
Vypolzovo, Uglichsky District, Yaroslavl Oblast, a village in Nikolsky Rural Okrug of Uglichsky District